Budha Pushkar Halt railway station is a small railway station in Ajmer district, Rajasthan, India. Its code is BPKH. It serves Pushkar city. The station consists of two platforms. The platforms are not well sheltered. It lacks many facilities including water and sanitation.

Major trains 
Some of the important trains that run from Budha Pushkar Halt are:
 Ajmer–Pushkar Passenger
 Pushkar–Ajmer Passenger

References

Railway stations in Ajmer district
Ajmer railway division